Fiona May Iapichino (born 12 December 1969 in Slough, England) is a retired track and field athlete who competed for the United Kingdom and later Italy in the long jump. She won the World Championships twice and two Olympic silver medals. Her personal best jump was 7.11 metres, which was her silver medal result at the 1998 European Championships.

Biography
She also competed briefly in the triple jump, and her career best of 14.65 metres from 1998 was good enough to place fifth in the world that season. May originally competed for Great Britain, but married Gianni Iapichino and became an Italian citizen in 1994. Iapichino, a former pole vaulter whose best achievements were a fifth and sixth place at the European Indoor Championships in 1992 and 1994, was her coach as well. May gave birth to a daughter in 2002, and missed the whole season as a result. Her last significant competition was the 2005 World Championships, where she failed to reach the final. May and Iapichino were married until 2011.

Born in Slough and raised in Derby, May attended Leeds Trinity & All Saints College, a college affiliated with the University of Leeds, studying economics, business management and administration. In 2006, she retired from competitions and started a new successful career in show business. After some modelling, she became the spokeswoman of the Kinder snacks and she won the Italian version of Dancing with the Stars in 2006. Later that year her acting debut was broadcast on Rai Uno as the protagonist of Butta la luna, a miniseries about racism and social integration.

In 2019 Fiona May become the testimonial of the Italian Salesians of Don Bosco's missions in Africa and particularly of their Ethiopian activities for baby mamas.

Family
May's parents are Jamaican. She is also rugby player Marcel Garvey's cousin. Her daughter, Larissa Iapichino, is following her parents' footsteps and is currently the 300 metres hurdles Italian and European champion.

Achievements

See also
Italian sportswomen multiple medalists at Olympics and World Championships
Italian record progression women's long jump
Italian all-time lists – Long jump
Italian all-time lists – Triple jump
FIDAL Hall of Fame
Naturalized athletes of Italy

References

External links
 

1969 births
Living people
Sportspeople from Slough
Sportspeople from Derby
Italian female long jumpers
English female long jumpers
Athletes (track and field) at the 1990 Commonwealth Games
Commonwealth Games bronze medallists for England
Olympic athletes of Italy
Olympic silver medalists for Italy
Commonwealth Games medallists in athletics
Olympic athletes of Great Britain
Athletes (track and field) at the 1988 Summer Olympics
Athletes (track and field) at the 1992 Summer Olympics
Athletes (track and field) at the 1996 Summer Olympics
Athletes (track and field) at the 2000 Summer Olympics
Athletes (track and field) at the 2004 Summer Olympics
European Athletics Championships medalists
World Athletics Championships athletes for Great Britain
World Athletics Championships athletes for Italy
World Athletics Championships medalists
Dancing with the Stars winners
Naturalised citizens of Italy
English emigrants to Italy
Italian people of Jamaican descent
Sportspeople of Jamaican descent
English sportspeople of Jamaican descent
Alumni of Leeds Trinity University
Alumni of the University of Leeds
Medalists at the 2000 Summer Olympics
Medalists at the 1996 Summer Olympics
Olympic silver medalists in athletics (track and field)
Universiade medalists in athletics (track and field)
Mediterranean Games gold medalists for Italy
Mediterranean Games medalists in athletics
Athletes (track and field) at the 2005 Mediterranean Games
Universiade silver medalists for Great Britain
World Athletics Indoor Championships winners
World Athletics Championships winners
Black British sportswomen
Medalists at the 1991 Summer Universiade
Reality show winners
Medallists at the 1990 Commonwealth Games